Dugary Ndabashinze  (born 8 October 1989 in Bujumbura) is a Burundian football midfielder who recently plays for Sài Gòn.

Club career 
He began his career at Atlético Olympic Bujumbura

In 2007, he moved to Atletico de Conakry in Guinea

In January 2008 he moved to Genk in the Belgian First Division. On 16 November 2008, he scored his first league goal for Genk, netting the equalizer in the 71st minute against SV Roeselare.

In the summer of 2012, he moved to newly promoted Waasland-Beveren.

Honours
Belgian First Division
Winner (1): 2010–11

External links

worldsoccerstats.com Profile
krcgenk.be 

1989 births
Living people
Burundian footballers
Burundi international footballers
Association football midfielders
K.R.C. Genk players
A.F.C. Tubize players
Belgian Pro League players
Challenger Pro League players
Burundian expatriate footballers
Burundian expatriate sportspeople in Belgium
Burundian expatriate sportspeople in Guinea
Expatriate footballers in Belgium
Athlético de Coléah players
S.K. Beveren players
Sportspeople from Bujumbura